William George McIntosh (2 November 1898 – 25 June 1963) was an Australian rules footballer who played with North Melbourne in the Victorian Football League (VFL).

Notes

External links 

1898 births
1963 deaths
Australian rules footballers from Melbourne
North Melbourne Football Club players
People from North Melbourne